The 1886 Michigan Wolverines football team represented the University of Michigan in the 1886 college football season. The team played only two games, both against . Michigan won both games by a combined score of 74 to 0. Charles D. Wright, a senior from Minneapolis, Minnesota, scored six touchdowns in the first game. The manager and goalkeeper was John L. Duffy, a senior from Ann Arbor.

Schedule

Horace Prettyman

The team's captain was Horace Greely Prettyman, from Bryan, Ohio.  Prettyman played eight years for the Michigan football team and was captain of the Michigan team three straight years from 1884 to 1886.  No other player in the history of Michigan football has been selected as captain three times. In Prettyman's three years as captain, Michigan never lost a game, winning seven games and outscoring opponents 192 to 10.

Game summaries

Game one: Michigan 50, Albion 0
The first game was played on October 16, 1886, at Albion, with Michigan winning by a score of 50–0. The Michigan Argonaut described the game as "a walk-over for our team." The score was already 37 to 0 when time was called for the half, and the Argonaut singled out Wright, Prettyman and Frank Higgins for their fine play. The writer noted that the Albion team was "not in fine trim" and failed to get the ball near the Michigan goal.  Perhaps trying to find something favorable to say about the opponent, the Argonaut reporter observed that "the Albion team did their best work in tackling."

Game two: Michigan 24, Albion 0

The second game was played at the Ann Arbor Fairgrounds on October 30, 1886, as part of a "field day" that included various athletic events.  Michigan won the football game against Albion 24 to 0. The Michigan Argonaut noted, "The most striking difference between the elevens was that of weight, U. of M. presenting a much heavier team. It was evident, however, that Albion had come to play ball, and what they lacked in avoirdupois was in great measure made up by neat and rapid playing." The teams agreed to play "two innings of thirty minutes each," and the "rugby game" started at 3:35 with referee George W. Whyte calling, "Play." Michigan lost the toss, and Jaycox kicked off for Michigan, sending the ball near Albion's goal line. Michigan scored its first touchdown seven minutes into the game to take the lead 6 to 0. Jaycox and Jim Duffy made several fine runs, and "Prettyman's play was characterized by his usual heavy rushing." Michigan scored a second touchdown "just before the inning was called," and led 12 to 0 at the intermission. The second inning began at 4:40 p.m., and the Argonaut reported that "Albion played a much better game in this inning that did Michigan, and several times it looked as though they would score." Jaycox and Jim Duffy made several bad fumbles in the second inning, and Morrow, "who had been serving in first-class style one-fourth back, made several poor throws to the half backs and lost ground for Michigan." Jim Duffy made two brilliant runs in the inning, and Jaycox ran for a touchdown shortly before the game ended. Albion objected that the field was "overrun with spectators," and also claimed that Jaycox had run out of bounds on his touchdown run, but the claim was overruled. The Argonaut concluded its report on the game by noting, "The Albion boys were gentlemen, and played a square game."

Players

Varsity letter winners
 Charles N. Banks, New Buffalo, Michigan - forward
 Frank F. Bumps, Shelby, Michigan - forward
 James E. Duffy, Ann Arbor, Michigan - halfback
 John L. Duffy - Ann Arbor, Michigan - goalkeeper and manager
William W. Harless, Chicago, Illinois - substitute
 Frank G. Higgins from Butte, Montana - forward
 George C. Higgins - forward
 John Jaycox, Philadelphia, Pennsylvania - halfback
Alexander C. Kiskadden, Tiffin, Ohio  - forward
 William M. Morrow, Union City, Pennsylvania - quarterback
Horace Greely Prettyman, Bryan, Ohio - forward
 Charles D. Wright from Minneapolis, Minnesota

Others
 William C. Malley, Chicago, Illinois - substitute
 Clifford C. Smith, Cleveland, Ohio - substitute
 Ernest Sprague, Farmington, Michigan - rusher
 William R. Trowbridge, Ann Arbor, Michigan - substitute

References

External links
 1886 Football Team – Bentley Historical Library, University of Michigan Athletics History
 The Michigan Argonaut, 1886-1887
 The Chronicle, 1886-1887

Michigan
Michigan Wolverines football seasons
College football undefeated seasons
Michigan Wolverines football